The 1956 season of the Venezuelan Primera División, the top category of Venezuelan football, was played by 5 teams. The national champions were Banco Obrero.

Results

Standings

External links
Venezuela 1956 season at RSSSF

Ven
Venezuelan Primera División seasons
1956 in Venezuelan sport